Eleuthranthes is a monotypic genus of flowering plants in the family Rubiaceae. The genus contains only one species, viz. Eleuthranthes liberiflora, which is endemic to Western Australia.

References

External links
Eleuthranthes in the World Checklist of Rubiaceae

Monotypic Rubiaceae genera